The 1966 Pittsburgh Pirates season involved the team's third-place finish in the National League at 92–70, three games behind the NL Champion Los Angeles Dodgers.

Offseason 
 November 22, 1965: Bill Virdon was released by the Pirates.
 November 29, 1965: 1965 rule 5 draft
Dave Roberts was selected by the Pirates from the Houston Astros.
Jesse Gonder was drafted by the Pirates from the Atlanta Braves.
 December 1, 1965: Matty Alou was traded to the Pirates by the San Francisco Giants for Ozzie Virgil and Joe Gibbon.
 December 10, 1965: Bob Friend was traded by the Pirates to the New York Yankees for Pete Mikkelsen.
 January 29, 1966: Del Unser was drafted by the Pirates in the 4th round of the secondary phase of the 1966 Major League Baseball Draft, but did not sign.

Regular season 
Pirates outfielder Roberto Clemente was the National League's Most Valuable Player for the 1966 season.

Season standings

Record vs. opponents

Game log

|- bgcolor="ccffcc"
| 1 || April 12 || @ Braves || 3–2 (13) || Schwall (1–0) || Cloninger || — || 50,671 || 1–0
|- bgcolor="ccffcc"
| 2 || April 13 || @ Braves || 6–0 || Law (1–0) || Johnson || — || 12,721 || 2–0
|- bgcolor="ffbbbb"
| 3 || April 15 || Cardinals || 2–9 || Gibson || Cardwell (0–1) || — || 32,231 || 2–1
|- bgcolor="ccffcc"
| 4 || April 16 || Cardinals || 5–3 || Sisk || Washburn || Face || 8,622 || 3–1
|- bgcolor="ccffcc"
| 5 || April 17 || Cardinals || 6–5 || Fryman (1–0) || Jackson || — || 12,684 || 4–1
|- bgcolor="ccffcc"
| 6 || April 18 || Reds || 4–3 || McBean (1–0) || Jay || Face (2) || 7,527 || 5–1
|- bgcolor="ccffcc"
| 7 || April 19 || Reds || 7–3 || Blass (1–0) || Ellis || — || 3,750 || 6–1
|- bgcolor="ccffcc"
| 8 || April 20 || Reds || 3–2 || Face (1–0) || Baldschun || — || 8,654 || 7–1
|- bgcolor="ccffcc"
| 9 || April 21 || Reds || 2–1 || Veale (1–0) || Pappas || — || 5,727 || 8–1
|- bgcolor="ffbbbb"
| 10 || April 22 || @ Cardinals || 5–7 || Washburn || Mikkelsen (0–1) || Aust || 19,785 || 8–2
|- bgcolor="ccffcc"
| 11 || April 23 || @ Cardinals || 5–4 || Mikkelsen (1–1) || Woodeshick || Face (3) || 11,508 || 9–2
|- bgcolor="ffbbbb"
| 12 || April 24 || @ Cardinals || 2–5 || Sadecki || Cardwell (0–2) || Stallard || 11,217 || 9–3
|- bgcolor="ffbbbb"
| 13 || April 25 || Phillies || 0–5 || Bunning || Veale (1–1) || — || 9,564 || 9–4
|- bgcolor="ccffcc"
| 14 || April 28 || @ Cubs || 9–6 (10) || Face (2–0) || Koonce || Mikkelsen (1) || 3,076 || 10–4
|- bgcolor="ffbbbb"
| 15 || April 29 || Mets || 2–5 (11) || Selma || Walker (0–1) || Sutherland || 8,665 || 10–5
|-

|- bgcolor="ccffcc"
| 16 || May 1 || Mets || 8–0 || Veale (2–1) || Fisher || — || 29,433 || 11–5
|- bgcolor="ccffcc"
| 17 || May 3 || @ Reds || 5–4 (12) || Face (3–0) || Ellis || — || 4,669 || 12–5
|- bgcolor="ccffcc"
| 18 || May 4 || @ Reds || 4–3 || Blass (2–0) || O'Toole || Purkey (1) || 4,019 || 13–5
|- bgcolor="ffbbbb"
| 19 || May 5 || @ Reds || 6–10 || Jay || McBean (1–1) || McCool || 3,735 || 13–6
|- bgcolor="ffbbbb"
| 20 || May 6 || @ Phillies || 7–8 (11) || Knowles || Face (3–1) || — || 18,982 || 13–7
|- bgcolor="ffbbbb"
| 21 || May 7 || @ Phillies || 3–7 || Bunning || Sisk (0–1) || — || 7,006 || 13–8
|- bgcolor="ccffcc"
| 22 || May 8 || @ Phillies || 3–2 || Veale (3–1) || Herbert || — || 8,411 || 14–8
|- bgcolor="ffbbbb"
| 23 || May 10 || Giants || 1–2 (15) || Linzy || Purkey (0–1) || Gibbon || 6,750 || 14–9
|- bgcolor="ffbbbb"
| 24 || May 11 || Giants || 1–6 || Perry || Schwall (1–1) || — || 4,373 || 14–10
|- bgcolor="ffbbbb"
| 25 || May 12 || Giants || 0–3 || Marichal || Veale (3–2) || — || 5,343 || 14–11
|- bgcolor="ccffcc"
| 26 || May 13 || Dodgers || 4–3 || Fryman (2–0) || Regan || — || 13,388 || 15–11
|- bgcolor="ffbbbb"
| 27 || May 14 || Dodgers || 1–4 || Koufax || Blass (2–1) || — || 11,602 || 15–12
|- bgcolor="ffbbbb"
| 28 || May 15 || Dodgers || 1–3 || Sutton || Cardwell (0–3) || Regan || 16,205 || 15–13
|- bgcolor="ccffcc"
| 29 || May 17 || Braves || 5–2 || Veale (4–2) || Blasingame || Face (4) || 7,938 || 16–13
|- bgcolor="ffbbbb"
| 30 || May 18 || Braves || 2–4 || Johnson || Law (1–1) || — || 7,642 || 16–14
|- bgcolor="ccffcc"
| 31 || May 20 || @ Dodgers || 7–3 || Mikkelsen (2–1) || Sutton || — || 33,484 || 17–14
|- bgcolor="ffbbbb"
| 32 || May 21 || @ Dodgers || 4–5 (12) || Perranoski || Schwall (1–2) || — || 34,839 || 17–15
|- bgcolor="ccffcc"
| 33 || May 22 || @ Dodgers || 4–0 || Veale (5–2) || Osteen || — || 30,826 || 18–15
|- bgcolor="ffbbbb"
| 34 || May 23 || @ Dodgers || 2–3 || Koufax || Mikkelsen (2–2) || — || 24,188 || 18–16
|- bgcolor="ffbbbb"
| 35 || May 24 || @ Giants || 2–5 || Perry || Law (1–2) || Linzy || 14,158 || 18–17
|- bgcolor="ccffcc"
| 36 || May 25 || @ Giants || 3–2 || Schwall (2–2) || Shaw || Face (5) || 9,663 || 19–17
|- bgcolor="ccffcc"
| 37 || May 26 || @ Astros || 3–2 || Blass (3–1) || Farrell || Mikkelsen (2) || 14,440 || 20–17
|- bgcolor="ccffcc"
| 38 || May 27 || @ Astros || 6–0 || Veale (6–2) || Latman || Mikkelsen (3) || 18,104 || 21–17
|- bgcolor="ffbbbb"
| 39 || May 28 || @ Astros || 1–2 || Giusti || Cardwell (0–4) || Raymond || 13,235 || 21–18
|- bgcolor="ccffcc"
| 40 || May 28 || @ Astros || 5–2 || Fryman (3–0) || Roberts || — || 30,383 || 22–18
|- bgcolor="ffbbbb"
| 41 || May 29 || @ Astros || 2–3 (11) || Raymond || Face (3–2) || — || 25,404 || 22–19
|- bgcolor="ccffcc"
| 42 || May 30 || Cubs || 3–2 || Mikkelsen (3–2) || Ellsworth || — ||  || 23–19
|- bgcolor="ccffcc"
| 43 || May 30 || Cubs || 5–3 || McBean (2–1) || Connors || Face (6) || 15,327 || 24–19
|- bgcolor="ffbbbb"
| 44 || May 31 || Cubs || 1–2 || Broglio || Veale (6–3) || — || 3,825 || 24–20
|-

|- bgcolor="ccffcc"
| 45 || June 1 || @ Mets || 3–1 || Cardwell (1–4) || Ribant || McBean (1) || 11,795 || 25–20
|- bgcolor="ccffcc"
| 46 || June 2 || @ Mets || 5–0 || Law (2–2) || Gardner || — || 11,785 || 26–20
|- bgcolor="ccffcc"
| 47 || June 3 || Astros || 7–2 || Fryman (4–0) || Dierker || — || 11,263 || 27–20
|- bgcolor="ccffcc"
| 48 || June 4 || Astros || 9–6 || Schwall (3–2) || Raymond || Mikkelsen (4) || 6,946 || 28–20
|- bgcolor="ccffcc"
| 49 || June 5 || Astros || 10–5 || Mikkelsen (4–2) || Bruce || — || 27,370 || 29–20
|- bgcolor="ccffcc"
| 50 || June 7 || Cardinals || 9–1 || Cardwell (2–4) || Gibson || — || 12,418 || 30–20
|- bgcolor="ffbbbb"
| 51 || June 8 || Cardinals || 5–11 || Dennis || Law (2–3) || — || 9,624 || 30–21
|- bgcolor="ffbbbb"
| 52 || June 9 || Cardinals || 2–4 || Jackson || Fryman (4–1) || — || 11,232 || 30–22
|- bgcolor="ffbbbb"
| 53 || June 10 || Braves || 2–8 || Johnson || Veale (6–4) || Olivo || 15,177 || 30–23
|- bgcolor="ccffcc"
| 54 || June 11 || Braves || 5–3 || Blass (4–1) || Umbach || Face (7) || 8,763 || 31–23
|- bgcolor="ccffcc"
| 55 || June 12 || Braves || 11–8 || Sisk (1–1) || Carroll || Face (8) || 14,520 || 32–23
|- bgcolor="ccffcc"
| 56 || June 13 || Reds || 5–4 || Mikkelsen (5–2) || McCool || — || 10,862 || 33–23
|- bgcolor="ffbbbb"
| 57 || June 14 || Reds || 0–3 || Maloney || Fryman (4–2) || — || 11,655 || 33–24
|- bgcolor="ffbbbb"
| 58 || June 15 || @ Cardinals || 0–1 || Gibson || Veale (6–5) || — || 21,652 || 33–25
|- bgcolor="ccffcc"
| 59 || June 16 || @ Cardinals || 2–1 || Blass (5–1) || Briles || Face (9) || 16,877 || 34–25
|- bgcolor="ccffcc"
| 60 || June 17 || @ Braves || 4–2 || Cardwell (3–4) || Carroll || Fryman (1) || 17,704 || 35–25
|- bgcolor="ccffcc"
| 61 || June 18 || @ Braves || 9–6 || Law (3–3) || Blasingame || Face (10) || 21,083 || 36–25
|- bgcolor="ccffcc"
| 62 || June 19 || @ Braves || 2–1 (11) || Veale (7–5) || Abernathy || — || 17,229 || 37–25
|- bgcolor="ffbbbb"
| 63 || June 21 || @ Reds || 8–11 || Nottebart || Fryman (4–3) || McCool || 7,665 || 37–26
|- bgcolor="ffbbbb"
| 64 || June 22 || @ Reds || 3–4 || Maloney || Mikkelsen (5–3) || — || 7,843 || 37–27
|- bgcolor="ffbbbb"
| 65 || June 23 || @ Reds || 3–5 || Pappas || Cardwell (3–5) || Nottebart || 6,039 || 37–28
|- bgcolor="ccffcc"
| 66 || June 24 || @ Phillies || 3–1 || Veale (8–5) || Bunning || — || 26,791 || 38–28
|- bgcolor="ffbbbb"
| 67 || June 25 || @ Phillies || 7–8 || Culp || Mikkelsen (5–4) || Craig || 23,160 || 38–29
|- bgcolor="ccffcc"
| 68 || June 26 || @ Phillies || 2–0 || Fryman (5–3) || Jackson || — || 18,734 || 39–29
|- bgcolor="ccffcc"
| 69 || June 27 || Astros || 8–5 || Blass (6–1) || Bruce || Face (11) || 11,679 || 40–29
|- bgcolor="ccffcc"
| 70 || June 28 || Astros || 4–3 || Veale (9–5) || Giusti || — || 11,713 || 41–29
|- bgcolor="ccffcc"
| 71 || June 29 || Astros || 6–5 || O'Dell (1–0) || Owens || — || 12,500 || 42–29
|- bgcolor="ccffcc"
| 72 || June 30 || Astros || 9–0 || Law (4–3) || Roberts || — || 15,183 || 43–29
|-

|- bgcolor="ccffcc"
| 73 || July 1 || @ Mets || 12–0 || Fryman (6–3) || Fisher || — || 24,056 || 44–29
|- bgcolor="ffbbbb"
| 74 || July 2 || @ Mets || 3–4 || Ribant || Blass (6–2) || Hamilton || 14,379 || 44–30
|- bgcolor="ccffcc"
| 75 || July 3 || @ Mets || 8–7 || Veale (10–5) || Rusteck || Face (12) ||  || 45–30
|- bgcolor="ffbbbb"
| 76 || July 3 || @ Mets || 8–9 || Gardner || McBean (2–2) || Hamilton || 28,296 || 45–31
|- bgcolor="ccffcc"
| 77 || July 4 || @ Cubs || 7–5 || Law (5–3) || Hands || Face (13) ||  || 46–31
|- bgcolor="ffbbbb"
| 78 || July 4 || @ Cubs || 4–6 (8) || Lee || Cardwell (3–6) || Hendley || 23,164 || 46–32
|- bgcolor="ccffcc"
| 79 || July 5 || @ Cubs || 6–0 || Fryman (7–3) || Faul || — || 6,183 || 47–32
|- bgcolor="ccffcc"
| 80 || July 6 || @ Cubs || 10–5 || Blass (7–2) || Ellsworth || Mikkelsen (5) || 6,483 || 48–32
|- bgcolor="ffbbbb"
| 81 || July 7 || @ Cubs || 4–5 || Hoeft || Mikkelsen (5–5) || Hendley || 7,063 || 48–33
|- bgcolor="ccffcc"
| 82 || July 8 || Mets || 10–2 || Law (6–3) || Shaw || — ||  || 49–33
|- bgcolor="ccffcc"
| 83 || July 8 || Mets || 9–2 || Sisk (2–1) || Fisher || O'Dell (1) || 32,440 || 50–33
|- bgcolor="ccffcc"
| 84 || July 9 || Mets || 6–3 || Fryman (8–3) || Hepler || — || 13,309 || 51–33
|- bgcolor="ccffcc"
| 85 || July 10 || Mets || 9–4 || Face (4–2) || Shaw || — || 26,150 || 52–33
|- bgcolor="ccffcc"
| 86 || July 14 || Cubs || 10–4 || Veale (11–5) || Ellsworth || — || 11,692 || 53–33
|- bgcolor="ffbbbb"
| 87 || July 15 || Cubs || 4–5 || Roberts || Law (6–4) || — || 15,488 || 53–34
|- bgcolor="ffbbbb"
| 88 || July 16 || Cubs || 1–4 || Hands || Fryman (8–4) || Jenkins || 9,764 || 53–35
|- bgcolor="ccffcc"
| 89 || July 17 || Giants || 7–4 || Blass (8–2) || Herbel || Mikkelsen (6) ||  || 54–35
|- bgcolor="ccffcc"
| 90 || July 17 || Giants || 7–1 || Sisk (3–1) || Priddy || — || 35,184 || 55–35
|- bgcolor="ffbbbb"
| 91 || July 18 || Giants || 2–3 || Perry || Veale (11–6) || McDaniel || 33,908 || 55–36
|- bgcolor="ccffcc"
| 92 || July 20 || @ Dodgers || 8–5 || Cardwell (4–6) || Brewer || McBean (2) || 39,545 || 56–36
|- bgcolor="ffbbbb"
| 93 || July 21 || @ Dodgers || 3–4 (10) || Regan || Face (4–3) || — || 35,586 || 56–37
|- bgcolor="ffbbbb"
| 94 || July 22 || @ Astros || 2–5 || Dierker || Blass (8–3) || — || 28,942 || 56–38
|- bgcolor="ccffcc"
| 95 || July 23 || @ Astros || 4–3 || McBean (3–2) || Raymond || Mikkelsen (7) || 43,825 || 57–38
|- bgcolor="ccffcc"
| 96 || July 24 || @ Astros || 11–6 || Cardwell (5–6) || Taylor || Face (14) || 34,556 || 58–38
|- bgcolor="ffbbbb"
| 97 || July 25 || @ Giants || 1–2 || Marichal || Fryman (8–5) || — || 22,191 || 58–39
|- bgcolor="ffbbbb"
| 98 || July 26 || @ Giants || 3–8 || Perry || Blass (8–4) || McDaniel || 21,786 || 58–40
|- bgcolor="ccffcc"
| 99 || July 27 || @ Giants || 5–3 || Mikkelsen (6–5) || Linzy || Face (15) || 22,154 || 59–40
|- bgcolor="ccffcc"
| 100 || July 29 || Phillies || 5–3 || O'Dell (2–0) || Short || Face (16) || 25,358 || 60–40
|- bgcolor="ffbbbb"
| 101 || July 30 || Phillies || 1–4 || Jackson || Fryman (8–6) || — || 15,804 || 60–41
|- bgcolor="ffbbbb"
| 102 || July 31 || Phillies || 1–8 || Bunning || Law (6–5) || — ||  || 60–42
|- bgcolor="ffbbbb"
| 103 || July 31 || Phillies || 5–6 (10) || Verbanic || Face (4–4) || Herbert || 28,947 || 60–43
|-

|- bgcolor="ffbbbb"
| 104 || August 1 || Dodgers || 1–5 || Regan || Sisk (3–2) || — || 27,398 || 60–44
|- bgcolor="ccffcc"
| 105 || August 2 || Dodgers || 6–5 || Mikkelsen (7–5) || Perranoski || McBean (3) || 12,886 || 61–44
|- bgcolor="ccffcc"
| 106 || August 3 || Dodgers || 3–1 || Veale (12–6) || Sutton || — || 21,952 || 62–44
|- bgcolor="ccffcc"
| 107 || August 4 || Dodgers || 8–1 || Law (7–5) || Osteen || — || 22,529 || 63–44
|- bgcolor="ffbbbb"
| 108 || August 5 || Reds || 3–4 || Pappas || Mikkelsen (7–6) || McCool || 20,064 || 63–45
|- bgcolor="ccffcc"
| 109 || August 6 || Reds || 9–3 || Sisk (4–2) || O'Toole || — || 11,401 || 64–45
|- bgcolor="ffbbbb"
| 110 || August 7 || Reds || 7–9 || Nottebart || Veale (12–7) || McCool || 18,470 || 64–46
|- bgcolor="ccffcc"
| 111 || August 9 || Mets || 2–1 || Fryman (9–6) || Ribant || Mikkelsen (8) || 12,847 || 65–46
|- bgcolor="ccffcc"
| 112 || August 10 || Mets || 10–4 || Law (8–5) || Shaw || O'Dell (2) || 15,008 || 66–46
|- bgcolor="ccffcc"
| 113 || August 11 || Mets || 7–5 || Face (5–4) || Gardner || — || 12,381 || 67–46
|- bgcolor="ccffcc"
| 114 || August 12 || @ Reds || 14–11 (13) || Sisk (5–2) || McCool || — || 25,477 || 68–46
|- bgcolor="ffbbbb"
| 115 || August 13 || @ Reds || 0–11 (5) || Maloney || Fryman (9–7) || — || 9,003 || 68–47
|- bgcolor="ccffcc"
| 116 || August 14 || @ Reds || 4–2 || Mikkelsen (8–6) || Nottebart || — || 19,767 || 69–47
|- bgcolor="ccffcc"
| 117 || August 16 || @ Mets || 3–0 (7) || Sisk (6–2) || McGraw || — || 23,953 || 70–47
|- bgcolor="ffbbbb"
| 118 || August 17 || @ Mets || 7–8 || Hepler || McBean (3–3) || Friend || 32,461 || 70–48
|- bgcolor="ffbbbb"
| 119 || August 18 || @ Mets || 5–9 || Gardner || Fryman (9–8) || Terry || 26,829 || 70–49
|- bgcolor="ffbbbb"
| 120 || August 19 || @ Cubs || 3–4 (11) || Hendley || Face (5–5) || — || 11,092 || 70–50
|- bgcolor="ccffcc"
| 121 || August 20 || @ Cubs || 3–2 || Sisk (7–2) || Hands || Mikkelsen (9) || 14,446 || 71–50
|- bgcolor="ccffcc"
| 122 || August 21 || @ Cubs || 8–1 || Veale (13–7) || Roberts || — || 15,944 || 72–50
|- bgcolor="ccffcc"
| 123 || August 22 || Phillies || 6–5 || Cardwell (6–6) || Buhl || Mikkelsen (10) || 15,119 || 73–50
|- bgcolor="ffbbbb"
| 124 || August 23 || Phillies || 4–5 || Short || O'Dell (2–1) || — || 25,504 || 73–51
|- bgcolor="ccffcc"
| 125 || August 24 || Phillies || 6–4 || Law (9–5) || Jackson || — || 19,899 || 74–51
|- bgcolor="ffbbbb"
| 126 || August 25 || Phillies || 1–4 || Bunning || Veale (13–8) || — || 25,658 || 74–52
|- bgcolor="ccffcc"
| 127 || August 26 || @ Cardinals || 7–4 || Fryman (10–8) || Jackson || Mikkelsen (11) || 43,951 || 75–52
|- bgcolor="ffbbbb"
| 128 || August 27 || @ Cardinals || 1–5 || Gibson || Blass (8–5) || — || 30,457 || 75–53
|- bgcolor="ffbbbb"
| 129 || August 28 || @ Cardinals || 2–3 || Washburn || Law (9–6) || Briles ||  || 75–54
|- bgcolor="ccffcc"
| 130 || August 28 || @ Cardinals || 5–1 || O'Dell (3–1) || Carlton || Mikkelsen (12) || 46,211 || 76–54
|- bgcolor="ffbbbb"
| 131 || August 29 || Astros || 0–2 || Cuellar || Veale (13–9) || — || 13,011 || 76–55
|- bgcolor="ccffcc"
| 132 || August 30 || Astros || 8–2 || Fryman (11–8) || Giusti || Mikkelsen (13) || 11,564 || 77–55
|- bgcolor="ccffcc"
| 133 || August 31 || Dodgers || 4–3 || Blass (9–5) || Drysdale || O'Dell (3) || 31,036 || 78–55
|-

|- bgcolor="ffbbbb"
| 134 || September 1 || Dodgers || 3–4 (10) || Sutton || Law (9–7) || Perranoski || 26,761 || 78–56
|- bgcolor="ccffcc"
| 135 || September 2 || Cubs || 7–3 || Veale (14–9) || Jenkins || Cardwell (1) || 13,677 || 79–56
|- bgcolor="ccffcc"
| 136 || September 3 || Cubs || 9–1 || Sisk (8–2) || Holtzman || — || 10,891 || 80–56
|- bgcolor="ccffcc"
| 137 || September 4 || Cubs || 8–5 || McBean (4–3) || Church || Face (17) || 12,899 || 81–56
|- bgcolor="ccffcc"
| 138 || September 5 || Braves || 13–5 || Law (10–7) || Kelley || — ||  || 82–56
|- bgcolor="ffbbbb"
| 139 || September 5 || Braves || 5–7 || Cloninger || Blass (9–6) || — || 30,747 || 82–57
|- bgcolor="ffbbbb"
| 140 || September 6 || Braves || 1–4 || Jarvis || Veale (14–10) || Ritchie || 10,792 || 82–58
|- bgcolor="ffbbbb"
| 141 || September 7 || Braves || 3–8 || Johnson || Sisk (8–3) || — || 12,100 || 82–59
|- bgcolor="ccffcc"
| 142 || September 9 || Cardinals || 3–2 (12) || Face (6–5) || Briles || — || 19,676 || 83–59
|- bgcolor="ffbbbb"
| 143 || September 10 || Cardinals || 5–6 || Gibson || Mikkelsen (8–7) || Woodeshick || 13,535 || 83–60
|- bgcolor="ffbbbb"
| 144 || September 11 || Cardinals || 3–4 || Hughes || Veale (14–11) || — || 17,859 || 83–61
|- bgcolor="ccffcc"
| 145 || September 13 || @ Astros || 9–3 || Sisk (9–3) || Giusti || Face (18) || 17,872 || 84–61
|- bgcolor="ffbbbb"
| 146 || September 15 || @ Dodgers || 3–5 || Drysdale || Law (10–8) || Regan || 50,559 || 84–62
|- bgcolor="ffbbbb"
| 147 || September 16 || @ Dodgers || 1–5 || Koufax || Veale (14–12) || — || 54,510 || 84–63
|- bgcolor="ccffcc"
| 148 || September 17 || @ Dodgers || 9–5 || Law (11–8) || Miller || O'Dell (4) || 44,330 || 85–63
|- bgcolor="ccffcc"
| 149 || September 18 || @ Giants || 3–1 || Fryman (12–8) || Perry || — || 41,981 || 86–63
|- bgcolor="ccffcc"
| 150 || September 19 || @ Giants || 6–1 (11) || Mikkelsen (9–7) || Linzy || — || 12,871 || 87–63
|- bgcolor="ccffcc"
| 151 || September 20 || @ Giants || 6–0 || Law (12–8) || Herbel || — || 30,187 || 88–63
|- bgcolor="ffbbbb"
| 152 || September 21 || @ Giants || 5–6 || Marichal || Face (6–6) || — || 15,338 || 88–64
|- bgcolor="ffbbbb"
| 153 || September 22 || @ Braves || 1–14 || Jarvis || Fryman (12–9) || — || 11,004 || 88–65
|- bgcolor="ccffcc"
| 154 || September 23 || @ Braves || 3–0 || Veale (15–12) || Schwall || — || 21,238 || 89–65
|- bgcolor="ccffcc"
| 155 || September 24 || @ Braves || 8–6 || Blass (10–6) || Olivo || Mikkelsen (14) || 20,054 || 90–65
|- bgcolor="ffbbbb"
| 156 || September 25 || @ Braves || 2–6 || Kelley || Sisk (9–4) || Carroll || 28,372 || 90–66
|- bgcolor="ffbbbb"
| 157 || September 26 || @ Phillies || 4–5 (11) || Bunning || O'Dell (3–2) || — || 8,289 || 90–67
|- bgcolor="ccffcc"
| 158 || September 28 || @ Phillies || 2–1 || Blass (11–6) || Bunning || Sisk (1) ||  || 91–67
|- bgcolor="ccffcc"
| 159 || September 28 || @ Phillies || 4–2 || Veale (16–12) || Jackson || — || 7,213 || 92–67
|-

|- bgcolor="ffbbbb"
| 160 || October 1 || Giants || 4–5 || Marichal || Mikkelsen (9–8) || — ||  || 92–68
|- bgcolor="ffbbbb"
| 161 || October 1 || Giants || 0–2 || Bolin || Sisk (9–5) || — || 18,928 || 92–69
|- bgcolor="ffbbbb"
| 162 || October 2 || Giants || 3–7 (11) || McDaniel || Blass (11–7) || — || 33,827 || 92–70
|-

|-
| Legend:       = Win       = LossBold = Pirates team member

Opening Day lineup

Notable transactions 
 April 7, 1966: Bob Purkey was sold to the Pirates by the St. Louis Cardinals.
 June 7, 1966: 1966 Major League Baseball draft
Richie Hebner was drafted by the Pirates in the 1st round of the 1966 Major League Baseball Draft.
Dave Cash was drafted by the Pirates in the 5th round of the 1966 Major League Baseball Draft.
Gene Clines was drafted by the Pirates in the 6th round of the 1966 Major League Baseball Draft.
 June 15, 1966: Don Schwall was traded by the Pirates to the Atlanta Braves for Billy O'Dell.

Roster

Statistics
Batting
Note: G = Games played; AB = At bats; H = Hits; Avg. = Batting average; HR = Home runs; RBI = Runs batted in

Pitching
Note: G = Games pitched; IP = Innings pitched; W = Wins; L = Losses; ERA = Earned run average; SO = Strikeouts

Farm system

Notes

References 
 1966 Pittsburgh Pirates team page at Baseball Reference
 1966 Pittsburgh Pirates Page at Baseball Almanac

Pittsburgh Pirates seasons
Pittsburgh Pirates season
Pittsburg